Samester Parkway Apartments is a historic apartment complex located at Baltimore, Maryland, United States. The 72-unit complex consists of two symmetrical detached wings, massed as stacked chevrons of six apartment buildings each, that face each other across a central courtyard.  They are three-story, red brick, garden apartment structures. The complex was constructed in 1939 in the Art Deco style.  It is an early example of Federal Housing Administration-financed garden apartments in Baltimore and is an excellent example of the American translation of European modern architectural style.
On May 28th, 2004, 3 children were beheaded in the apartments. 

Samester Parkway Apartments was listed on the National Register of Historic Places in 1999.

References

External links
, including photo from 1998, at Maryland Historical Trust

Apartment buildings in Baltimore
Art Deco architecture in Maryland
Buildings and structures in Baltimore
Fallstaff, Baltimore
Residential buildings completed in 1939
Residential buildings on the National Register of Historic Places in Baltimore